System 2000 or similar may refer to:

 Federal Telecommunications System 2000, digital telecommunications service for the US federal government
 Satellite Control and Operation System 2000, a satellite Mission Control System software infrastructure from the European Space Agency
 Systema 2000 (also known as the Game Master), a monochrome handheld game console from the early 1990s
 System 2000 (software), a Database Management System (DBMS)